Williamson Provincial Park is a small provincial park in northwestern Alberta, Canada.

The park is situated on the southern shore of Sturgeon Lake, 19 km west of Valleyview on Highway 43. It lies across Sturgeon Lake from the much larger Young's Point Provincial Park.

Recreational activities in the park include swimming (a gravel beach) and boating (a standard boat launch area). Facilities for camping are also provided.

See also
List of provincial parks in Alberta
List of Canadian provincial parks
List of National Parks of Canada

External links
Alberta Development - Park page
DiscoverThePeaceCountry.com Pictures and Camping Information on Willimson Provincial Park - Sturgeon Lake

Municipal District of Greenview No. 16
Provincial parks of Alberta